Vagabon is the self-titled second studio album by Cameroon-born musician Laetitia Tamko, under the stage name Vagabon. It was released on October 19, 2019 through Nonesuch Records. Vagabon was written, arranged, and produced by Tamko.

Vagabon received universal acclaim from music critics, who praised the artist's change in sound from guitar-based indie rock to more orchestral, electronic indie pop. Vagabon appeared on several year-end best album lists in 2019.

Background
Tamko began working on the album in 2017 after the release of her debut album Infinite Worlds that same year. Vagabon was originally titled All the Women in Me and scheduled for release on September 27, 2019. The title was a quote from a poem by Nayyirah Waheed. However, at the request of Waheed, the album title and several lyrics were changed due to her not approving Tamko quoting her, which caused the album to be pushed back to October 19, 2019. Two song titles also changed, including "Flood Hands" to "Flood" and "All the Women" to "Every Woman".

Music and lyrics
The album's themes include empowerment, self-exploration, and understanding. Tamko cited Frank Ocean's Blonde album as a reference point for Vagabon, stating that she liked the way it conveyed a deep sense of intimacy. In an interview with Bandcamp, Tamko said that writing the record became a way for her to have an emotional reckoning with herself. "I was in a space in my life of not trying to feel like the victim and just move to survivorhood," she said. After she began working through her own trauma, she started examining the ways that she may have hurt others. "I was asking myself a lot of questions once I had the space to do it: 'What kind of person am I being? How am I to other people?' I'm turning the heat on myself."

Composition
Vagabon is unique for exchanging Tamko's rock sounds for a new electronic palette. It digs into "sleeker" house music and synth-pop, as well as art pop, electronic pop, indie pop and new wave. Its sound is also seen as fitting somewhere between bedroom pop and "emotive" electronica.

Critical reception

Vagabon was met with universal acclaim. At Metacritic, which assigns a normalized rating out of 100 to reviews from mainstream publications, the album received an average score of 82, based on 16 reviews.

Harry Todd of Paste described the album as "a more formless affair, a cosmic journey through synthetic sounds, lush orchestral suites and lyrical self-realization" and "an ambitious album overflowing with generosity and empathy, warm in production and rich in theme." Ann-Derrick Gaillot of Pitchfork wrote, "Vagabon concludes as a work of not only personal self-discovery, but evolution in real time." Lauren deHollogne of Clash declared the album "simply captivating from start to finish" and "the work of an immensely talented melodic mastermind." In her five-star review of the album, Bethany Davison of The Skinny wrote, "Vagabon is a record both stripped back yet electronically rich, genre disparate, but ultimately inclusive. A rewarding listen, it's an achievement beyond comprehension." Émilie Kneifel of Exclaim! summarized the album as "good both for bobbing heads and bopping feet — both for being alone-alone, and alone-around-others, too."

Track listing
All songs were written and produced by Laetitia Tamko.

Personnel

Musicians
According to the record's Bandcamp page.

Vagabon
 Laetitia Tamko – vocals , drums , keyboards , guitars , synths , bass , Wurlitzer , percussion , piano 

Additional musicians
 Cameron Wisch – percussion
 Emily Elkin – cello
 Eric Littmann – drums and synths
 Evan Lawrence – bass guitar
 Jakob Hersch – guitar
 Jannik Schneider – drums
 Julie Byrne – additional vocals
 Kate Outterbridge – viola
 Laurens Bauer – bass guitar
 Meg Duffy – guitar
 Melina Duterte – trumpet
 Naomie De Lorimier – additional vocals
 Oliver Hill – violin and Wurlitzer
 Sadek Massarweh – guitar and additional vocals
 Sasami Ashworth – French horn
 Thomas Bartlett – synths

Technical
 Laetitia Tamko – producer, engineer
 Jason Agel – engineer
 Eric Littmann – engineer
 Andrew Lappin – engineer
 Thomas Bartlett – engineer
 John Congleton – mixer
 Ted Jensen – mastering

References

2019 albums
Nonesuch Records albums